Geobacter toluenoxydans  is a bacterium from the genus of Geobacter which has been isolated from sludge from an aquifer in Stuttgart in Germany.

See also 
 List of bacterial orders
 List of bacteria genera

References

 

Bacteria described in 2010
Thermodesulfobacteriota